Vijay Rajindernath (7 January 1928 – 22 November 1989) was an Indian cricketer.

Career
Rajindernath was one of the four wicket-keepers that India tried against Pakistan in the 1952–53 series. He played in the Third Test at Bombay which India won losing only four wickets. Rajindernath did not bat but effected four stumpings, three of which were off Subhash Gupte. He holds the Test record for the most stumpings in a complete career without a catch. He was replaced by Ebrahim Maka for the next Test. 

Rajindernath also played in three unofficial Tests against a touring Commonwealth XI in 1950-51. In December 1950 he hit his only first-class century, when he scored 136 for Bihar in their innings victory over Orissa in the Ranji Trophy.

Rajindernath studied at Government College, Lahore, and took an MA in Hindi from Benares. He worked for Burmah Shell and later with Indo-Nippon batteries in Baroda.

See also
One Test Wonder

References

External links

Sources
Obituary in ACSSI almanac, 1989/90

1989 deaths
1928 births
India Test cricketers
Indian cricketers
Mumbai cricketers
Northern India cricketers
Southern Punjab cricketers
Uttar Pradesh cricketers
Bihar cricketers
Eastern Punjab cricketers
North Zone cricketers
East Zone cricketers
Cricketers from Amritsar
Wicket-keepers
Government College University, Lahore alumni
Banaras Hindu University alumni